Ilirjan is an Albanian masculine given name and may refer to:
Ilirjan Çaushaj (born 1987), Albanian footballer 
Ilirjan File (born 1969), Albanian footballer and coach
Ilirjan Suli (born 1975), Albanian weightlifter
Ilirjan Thaçi (1995–2013), Albanian footballer

Albanian masculine given names